"The Farmer's Wife" is an 8-page comic book story by Joe Simon and Jack Kirby published in their genre-launching romance comic book, Young Romance in 1947. The story tells of a young nurse and her marriage to a farmer fifteen years her senior.  Typical of romance comics of the era, the tale expresses male viewpoints on female behavior, domesticity, love, sex, and marriage, and advocates female self-sacrifice for the sake of a lasting marriage.

Background 
Following World War II, adult readership of comic books increased but caped crime fighters and superheroes were dismissed as passé.  Joe Simon and Jack Kirby attempted to fill the void in adult comics material by launching the romance comic book, Young Romance, in 1947.  The venture was a great success and the two creators followed the title in 1949 with Young Love. Romance comic books became a cultural sensation with dozens of titles hitting newsstands and drug store racks in the early 1950s.

Plot 
Nurse Nancy, a city dweller, and Bill Toomey, a war-wounded veteran and farmer fifteen years her senior marry.  When Bill takes a job with the U.S. Department of Agriculture, the two journey to Washington, DC but Bill is unhappy in the city.  He returns from work every night tired while Nancy wants to attend parties and shows. 

One night, she vents her frustrations and goes out alone. When she returns home, she finds a note from Bill telling her he has left for his farm and is willing to grant her a divorce because she is obviously unhappy with him. Nancy breaks into tears and bewails her selfishness.  She leaves her job in the city and goes to Bill's farm to renew her marriage on Bill's terms.

Analysis 
Typical of the other stories in the first issue of Young Romance, and typical of the many romance comic book stories to follow in the years to come, "The Farmer's Wife" is told by the female protagonist but is written by males and expresses male perspectives on female behavior, gender roles, love, sex, and marriage. The story is a cautionary morality tale that investigates the perils of female independence, celebrates domesticity, and advocates female self-sacrifice for the sake of a lasting marriage.

References 
 
 

Fictional farmers
Fictional nurses
Romance comics